M. Jackson "Jack" Nichols is an American politician who served as a Democratic member of the North Carolina House of Representatives from 2022 to 2023. An attorney from Raleigh, North Carolina, he represented the 34th district (including constituents in Wake County).

North Carolina House of Representatives
Nichols ran unsuccessfully for the North Carolina House of Representatives in 2000, losing to Republican incumbent Art Pope. Nichols also ran unsuccessfully for the North Carolina Senate in 2004 and 2008. Representative Grier Martin resigned his seat in the NC House on July 8, 2022 to take a job at the pentagon, and local Democrats selected Nichols to serve the balance of Martin's term. Nichols will not be a candidate for  the seat in the 2022 election.

Electoral history

2008

2004

2000

References

Living people
Year of birth missing (living people)
People from Quantico, Virginia
People from Raleigh, North Carolina
Davidson College alumni
Duke University alumni
Wake Forest University alumni
North Carolina lawyers
21st-century American politicians
Democratic Party members of the North Carolina House of Representatives